The roads of Kosovo form the backbone of its transportation system.

Network statistics
Total: 1,926 km
Country comparison to the world: 175
Paved: 1,668 km
Unpaved: 258 km

Motorways

 R 6 (part of E65) Autostrada  Arbën Xhaferi (under construction) (Pristina-Hani i Elezit)
At 31 December 2016 the first 20 kilometers from Pristina to Babush i Muhaxherve are for the traffic in service. At 22 December 2017 the 11 kilometers from Babush i Muhaxherve to Ferizaj (Bibaj) are for the traffic in service.
 R 7 (part of E851) Autostrada Ibrahim Rugova (Vërmicë-Prishtina)
 R 7.1 (under construction) (Prishtina-Muçibabë)

Main roads/National roads

M-2 (part of E65 and E80) Pristina - Mitrovica

M-25 (part of E65) Merdare - Vermica

M-9 Peja - Border with Serbia

References
International E-road network

External links
Infrastructure of Kosovo official website